Sing, Choirs of Angels! is a Christmas album released by Mormon Tabernacle Choir. The album was originally released in 2004.  It became the first choir recording to make Billboard Magazine's Top 25 Christian chart.

Album information

Track listing

Charts

Tabernacle Choir albums
2004 Christmas albums
Christmas albums by American artists